Rodney Blaine Graber (June 20, 1930 in Massillon, Ohio - December 5, 2014 in San Diego, California) was a former Major League Baseball center fielder. He was signed as an amateur free agent by the Cleveland Indians in 1949. He did not play in the major leagues until 1958, where he went 1 for 8 over two games played as an outfielder. He did not make an error and had four putouts.

External links

References

1930 births
2014 deaths
Cleveland Indians players
Indianapolis Indians players
San Diego Padres (minor league) players
Major League Baseball center fielders
Baseball players from Ohio
Newport Canners players